Uncleby is a hamlet in the East Riding of Yorkshire, England. It forms part of the civil parish of Kirby Underdale.

History
Uncleby is the site of an Anglian cemetery. 76 inhumation burials were excavated by Canon William Greenwell in 1868. These graves date from the 7th and 8th centuries AD. The objects from these excavations are held in the Yorkshire Museum and the British Museum.

References

External links

Hamlets in the East Riding of Yorkshire